Tzachas, also known as Chaka Bey was an 11th-century Seljuk Turkish military commander who ruled an independent state based in Smyrna. Originally in Byzantine service, he rebelled and seized Smyrna, much of the Aegean coastlands of Asia Minor and the islands lying off shore in 1088–91. At the peak of his power, he even declared himself Byzantine emperor, and sought to assault Constantinople in conjunction with the Pechenegs. In 1092, a Byzantine naval expedition under John Doukas inflicted a heavy defeat on him and retook Lesbos, while in the next year he was treacherously slain by his son-in-law Kilij Arslan I. Smyrna and the rest of Tzachas' former domain were recovered by the Byzantines a few years later, in  1097.

Life
Very little is known about his life, and that mostly from only one source, the Alexiad of the Byzantine princess Anna Komnene, daughter of Emperor Alexios I Komnenos. He is also mentioned in the 13th-century Danishmendname as Chavuldur Chaka, but it is not a very reliable source due to the semi-legendary nature of its material.

According to the Alexiad, Tzachas was originally a raider, who was taken as a prisoner by the Byzantines during the reign of Nikephoros III Botaneiates. Tzachas entered Byzantine service and advanced rapidly through imperial favour, receiving the title of protonobilissimus and rich gifts. However, when Alexios I Komnenos deposed Botaneiates in 1081, Tzachas lost his position and fled Byzantium.

From ca. 1088 on, he used his base at Smyrna to wage war against the Byzantines. Employing Christian craftsmen, he built a fleet, with which he captured Phocaea and the eastern Aegean islands of Lesbos (except for the fortress of Methymna), Samos, Chios and Rhodes. A Byzantine fleet under Niketas Kastamonites was sent against him, but Tzachas defeated it in battle. Some modern scholars have speculated that his activities during this time may have been in conjunction, and perhaps even coordination, with two contemporary Byzantine rebels, Rhapsomates in Cyprus, and Karykes in Crete.

In 1090/91, the Byzantines under Constantine Dalassenos recovered Chios. Undeterred, Tzachas rebuilt his forces, and resumed his attacks, even proclaiming himself emperor (basileus) and seeking to conclude an alliance against Alexios I with the Pechenegs in Thrace for a joint attack on Constantinople. In 1092, Dalassenos and the new megas doux, John Doukas, were sent against Tzachas, and attacked the fortress of Mytilene on Lesbos. Tzachas resisted for three months, but finally had to negotiate a surrender of the fortress. During his return to Smyrna, Dalassenos attacked the Turkish fleet, which was almost destroyed.

According to the Alexiad, in spring 1093, Tzachas attacked the port of Abydos in the Sea of Marmara. Alexios I called upon the Sultan of the Seljuk Sultanate of Rum Kilij Arslan I, who was married to Tzachas's daughter Ayşe Hatun and was thus his son-in-law, to attack Tzachas from the rear. The Sultan advanced to Abydos, where, at the pretext of inviting Tzachas to a banquet, he had his father-in-law murdered. However,  a "Tzachas"—possibly the original Tzachas' son—is reported as still holding Smyrna when the Byzantine army under John Doukas recaptured the city.

Legacy 
The modern Turkish Naval Forces officially consider 1081, the capture of Smyrna by Tzachas, as their founding date.

See also
Seljuk campaigns in the Aegean

Footnotes

References

Sources

Further reading
 
 
 
 

1090s deaths
Medieval Smyrna
Byzantine–Seljuk wars
Medieval Aegean Sea
Year of birth unknown
Generals of the Seljuk Empire
Byzantine usurpers
11th-century Turkic people
11th-century murdered monarchs
Nobilissimi
Turkic rulers